Rod Hughes (born 20 June 1954) is a former Australian rules footballer who played for St Kilda in the Victorian Football League (VFL).

Hughes, a rover, was a member of the Scottsdale team which claimed the Tasmanian State Premiership in 1973. He represented Tasmania at interstate football in 1975 and made seven appearances with St Kilda in the 1977 VFL season, when they finished last.

References

Holmesby, Russell and Main, Jim (2007). The Encyclopedia of AFL Footballers. 7th ed. Melbourne: Bas Publishing.

1954 births
Living people
St Kilda Football Club players
Scottsdale Football Club players
Clarence Football Club players
Australian rules footballers from Tasmania